Tavakkolabad-e Ranjabar (also Romanized as Tavakkolābād-e Ranjabar; also known as Tavakkolābād) is a village in Kabutar Khan Rural District, in the Central District of Rafsanjan County, Kerman Province, Iran. At the 2006 census, its population was 23, in 4 families.

References 

Populated places in Rafsanjan County